The following is a list of Nippon Professional Baseball players with the last name starting with J, retired or active.

J

References

External links
Japanese Baseball

 J